is a junction railway station in the city of Tōkai, Aichi Prefecture,  Japan, operated by Meitetsu.

Lines

Station layout
The station has three elevated island platforms, 2 on the 2nd level, and the other on the 3rd level.  The station has automated ticket machines, Manaca automated turnstiles and is staffed.

Platforms
2nd level

3rd level

Adjacent stations

Station history
Ōtagawa Station was opened on February 18, 1912, as a station on the Aichi Electric Railway Company. The privately owned Chita Railways connected to the station on April 1, 1931. The Aichi Electric Railway became part of the Meitetsu group on August 1, 1935, followed by the Chita Railway on February 1, 1943.  The tracks were elevated from 2007 to 2008 and the station building rebuilt from 2010 to 2012.

Passenger statistics
In fiscal 2017, the station was used by an average of 19,445 passengers daily

Surrounding area
Tokai City Hall
Nihon Fukushi University

See also
 List of Railway Stations in Japan

References

External links

 Official web page

Railway stations in Japan opened in 1912
Railway stations in Aichi Prefecture
Stations of Nagoya Railroad
Tōkai, Aichi